E. Ramakrishnan is an Indian politician and former Member of the Legislative Assembly of Tamil Nadu. He was elected to the Tamil Nadu legislative assembly as a Dravida Munnetra Kazhagam candidate from Acharapakkam constituency in  1989 election and as an Anna Dravida Munnetra Kazhagam candidate 1991 election.

References 

Dravida Munnetra Kazhagam politicians
Living people
Tamil Nadu MLAs 1989–1991
Tamil Nadu MLAs 1991–1996
Year of birth missing (living people)
All India Anna Dravida Munnetra Kazhagam politicians